Silvino Manuel da Luz (born 1939) is a former Cape Verdean politician and diplomat. Da Luz was the second foreign minister of his country from 1981 to 1991. He succeeded Abílio Duarte and was succeeded by Jorge Carlos Fonseca.

References

1939 births
Living people
Cape Verdean diplomats
Foreign ministers of Cape Verde